Agathodes transiens is a moth in the family Crambidae. It was described by Eugene G. Munroe in 1960. It is found in Bolivia.

References

Moths described in 1960
Spilomelinae
Moths of South America